East Stoke may refer to three places in the United Kingdom:

East Stoke, Dorset
East Stoke, Nottinghamshire
East Stoke, Somerset

See also

North Stoke (disambiguation)
South Stoke (disambiguation)
Stoke (disambiguation)